Mike Halapin (born July 1, 1973) is a former American football Defensive tackle, Offensive guard. He played defensive tackle for the Houston Oilers in 1996 and the Tennessee Oilers in 1997.  He played offensive guard for the Rhein Fire in 1999 and for the New Orleans Saints in 1999 and 2000.

References

1973 births
Living people
American football defensive tackles
Pittsburgh Panthers football players
Houston Oilers players
Tennessee Oilers players
Rhein Fire players
New Orleans Saints players